Manuel Mosquera may refer to:

Manuel Mosquera (footballer, born 1968), Spanish football manager and former forward
Manuel Mosquera (footballer, born 1984), Panamanian football striker
Manu Mosquera (born 1999), Spanish football forward